Andrew Morris  was Dean of St Asaph from 1634 until he was deprived by the Commonwealth of England.

Morris was educated at Oriel College, Oxford. He was Chaplain of All Souls' College, Oxford and held livings at Erbistock, Oddington, Chiddingstone,  Llanycil and Corwen. He died in 1654.

References 

Deans of St Asaph
1654 deaths
Alumni of Oriel College, Oxford
17th-century Welsh clergy